Last Exit to Brooklyn is a 1989 drama film directed by Uli Edel and adapted by Desmond Nakano from Hubert Selby Jr.'s 1964 novel of the same title. The film is an international co-production between Germany, the UK, and the United States. The story is set in 1950s Brooklyn and takes place against the backdrop of a labor strike. It follows interlocking storylines among the working class underbelly of the Red Hook neighborhood, including unionized workers, sex workers, and drag queens.

Plot
In 1952 Brooklyn, workers have entered the sixth month of a strike against the local factory. Shop steward Harry Black relishes his new role as the strike secretary as it allows him to get out of the house, away from his wife who does not realize that Harry is gay. Boyce, the union leader, tries to negotiate between the factory and union representatives.

Meanwhile, Tralala is a prostitute who lures unsuspecting sailors out to a vacant lot to be robbed by Vinnie, an ex-convict and Tralala's pimp. Georgette is a young transgender woman who harbors a crush on Vinnie. Big Joe, one of the striking workers, struggles with accepting his daughter's out of wedlock pregnancy and embracing his future son-in-law.

Harry meets Regina, another transgender woman, and falls in love with her. Tralala also meets a kindly sailor in Manhattan who appears to truly love her and lets her move in with him. Both romances end on tragic notes for Harry and Tralala.

Cast

 Stephen Lang as Harry Black
 Jennifer Jason Leigh as Tralala
 Burt Young as Big Joe
 Peter Dobson as Vinnie
 Jerry Orbach as Boyce
 Stephen Baldwin as Sal
 Jason Andrews as Tony
 James Lorinz as Freddy
 Sam Rockwell as Al
 Maia Danziger as Mary Black
 Camille Saviola as Ella
 Ricki Lake as Donna
 Cameron Johann as Spook
 John Costelloe as Tommy
 Christopher Murney as Paulie
 Alexis Arquette as Georgette
 Zette as Regina
 Mark Boone Junior as Willie
 Rutanya Alda as Georgette's mother

Production

Development 
There had been several attempts to adapt Last Exit to Brooklyn into a film since the controversial book's 1964 publication. One of the earliest attempts was made by producer Steve Krantz and animator Ralph Bakshi, who wanted to direct a live-action film based on the novel. Bakshi had sought out the rights to the novel after completing Heavy Traffic, a film which shared many themes with Selby's novel. Selby agreed to the adaptation, and actor Robert De Niro accepted the role of Harry in Strike. According to Bakshi, "the whole thing fell apart when Krantz and I had a falling out over past business. It was a disappointment to me and Selby. Selby and I tried a few other screenplays after that on other subjects, but I could not shake Last Exit from my mind." An adaptation was also considered by Stanley Kubrick and Brian de Palma at one point.

German producer Bernd Eichinger and director Uli Edel had been wanting to adapt the novel for 20 years, with the latter having first discovered the novel as a university student. The two filmmakers obtained the rights to Selby's novel in the mid-1980s after Edel's success with the film Christiane F.

One of the challenges of adapting Selby's book was combining its different stories and characters into one film. Screenwriter Desmond Nakano was brought on to pen the screenplay.

Filming 
Filming took place over 14 weeks in the summer of 1988 on location in the Red Hook section of Brooklyn, "only blocks from the housing projects where Mr. Selby lived while writing Last Exit."

Some scenes for the film were shot at Montero's Bar and Grill, which was owned by Pilar Montero and her husband.

Reception

Release

The film was first released in Europe in 1989, where it was a critical and a commercial success. The film had a limited distribution in the United States in May 1990 after delays to its release date. Some theaters, such as the Edwards theater in Orange County, declined to show the film because of its dark and graphic subject matter.

Critical response
The film has a 67% rating on review aggregator website Rotten Tomatoes based on 21 critics' reviews.

Though critics noted the film's unrelenting bleakness and how it is not an easy watch, Last Exit to Brooklyn was also praised for Uli Edel's direction and the performances of its actors. Vincent Canby of The New York Times wrote the film "is both grim and eloquent. The strike scenes are some of the roughest ever seen in a fiction film." Canby added the film "has a European sensibility that works to the advantage of its American subject matter...[and] sees everything at the distance of a sober-minded alien observer. One result is that 'Last Exit to Brooklyn' never appears to exploit its sensational subject matter." He concluded the film "suggests that physical, social, psychological and political degradation can only be understood when seen in something like their true dimensions. Without hope." In a review that awarded 3 and ½ stars out of four, Roger Ebert wrote the characters "are limited in their freedom to imagine greater happiness for themselves, and yet in their very misery they embody human striving. There is more of humanity in a prostitute trying to truly love, if only for a moment, than in all of the slow-motion romantic fantasies in the world."

Sheila Benson of the Los Angeles Times wrote, "The strike-breaking attempt at the factory is Last Exit’s vast visual set-piece, a long and magnificently staged mass of moving bodies and machinery that shows Edel’s accomplished and painterly eye and the remarkable camera work of Stefan Czapsky." Benson singled out Jennifer Jason Leigh as the "defiantly tragic Tralala, [Ohrbach’s] [sic] implacable union leader, Stephen Lang’s self-hating Harry Black and Alexis Arquette’s dry wit-over-desperation as Georgette" as the film's standout performances.

Accolades
For her role as Tralala in this film and her role in Miami Blues, Jennifer Jason Leigh won the award for Best Supporting Actress from both the New York Film Critics Circle and the Boston Society of Film Critics.

Home media 
Last Exit to the Brooklyn was released on Blu-ray by Summit Entertainment in October 2011.

See also
 Last Exit to Brooklyn (soundtrack)

References

External links
 
 
 
 
 "Anima Animus: Jennifer Jason Leigh’s Bisexual Method in Last Exit to Brooklyn" (Alphaville journal)

1989 films
1989 drama films
1989 LGBT-related films
1989 independent films
American drama films
American independent films
American LGBT-related films
British drama films
British independent films
British LGBT-related films
Drag (clothing)-related films
English-language German films
Films about drugs
Films about prostitution in the United States
Films about rape
Films about the labor movement
Films based on American novels
Films based on works by Hubert Selby Jr.
Films directed by Uli Edel
Films produced by Bernd Eichinger
Films set in Brooklyn
Films set in the 1950s
Films shot in Bavaria
Films shot in New York (state)
German drama films
German independent films
German LGBT-related films
LGBT-related drama films
Transgender-related films
West German films
1980s English-language films
1980s American films
1980s British films
1980s German films